Kamila Kordovská (born 4 December 1997) is a Czech handballer for french league club Handball Plan-de-Cuques and the Czech national team.

She participated at the 2018 European Women's Handball Championship.

References

External links

1997 births
Living people
Sportspeople from Prague
Czech female handball players
Expatriate handball players
Czech expatriate sportspeople in Germany